Small Beer Press is a publisher of fantasy and literary fiction, based in Northampton, Massachusetts. It was founded by Gavin Grant and Kelly Link in 2000 and publishes novels, collections, and anthologies. It also publishes the zine Lady Churchill's Rosebud Wristlet, chapbooks, the Peapod Classics line of classic reprints, and limited edition printings of certain titles. The Press has been acknowledged for its children and young-adult publications,<ref>Rosen, Judith. "Small Beer, for Children" in Publishers Weekly, September 15, 2008.</ref> and as a leading small-publisher of literary science-fiction and fantasy.

Authors published to date include Kate Wilhelm, John Crowley, Sean Stewart, Maureen McHugh, Benjamin Rosenbaum, Kelly Link, Carol Emshwiller, Ray Vukcevich, Joan Aiken, Howard Waldrop, Ellen Kushner, John Kessel, and Alan DeNiro.

Imprints
Big Mouth House – Created in 2008 to publish works of fiction for all ages. The imprint first began publishing with the appearance of a complete collection of celebrated English novelist Joan Aiken's Armitage Family short stories, originally published separately between 1953 and 1984.

Peapod Classics – Created in 2004 to reprint classic works of fiction. To date the imprint has published three volumes, debuting with the influential first novel of Carol Emshwiller, Carmen Dog, a feminist work first published by Mercury House in 1990 and out of print since then.

Small Beer Press publications
2000
 4 Stories, Kelly Link
 Five Forbidden Things, by Dora Knez

2001
 Stranger Things Happen, by Kelly Link

2002
 Lord Stink & Other Stories, by Judith Berman
 The Mount, by Carol Emshwiller
 Report to the Men's Club and Other Stories, by Carol Emshwiller
 Rossetti Song: Four Stories, by Alex Irvine
 Meet Me in the Moon Room, by Ray Vukcevich

2003
 Howard Waldrop Interview (CD Recording), Conducted by Ellen Datrow
 Kalpa Imperial: The Great Empire That Never Was, by Angélica Gorodischer
 Trampoline: An Anthology, Edited by Kelly Link
 Foreigners and Other Faces, by Mark Rich
 Other Cities, by Benjamin Rosenbaum
 Bittersweet Creek, by Christopher Rowe

2004
 Horses Blow Up Dog City & Other Stories, by Richard Butner
 Carmen Dog, by Carol Emshwiller
 Trash Sex Magic, by Jennifer Stevenson
 Perfect Circle, by Sean Stewart

2005
 Magic for Beginners, by Kelly Link
 Travel Light, by Naomi Mitchison
 Mockingbird, by Sean Stewart
 Storyteller: Writing Lessons and More from 27 Years of the Clarion Writers' Workshop, by Kate Wilhelm

2006
 Skinny Dipping in the Lake of the Dead, by Alan DeNiro
 The Privilege of the Sword, by Ellen Kushner
 Mothers & Other Monsters, by Maureen F. McHugh
 Howard Who?, by Howard Waldrop

2007
 Generation Loss, by Elizabeth Hand
 Water Logic, by Laurie J. Marks
 Interfictions: An Anthology of Interstitial Writing, Edited by Delia Sherman and Theodora Goss

2008
 The Serial Garden: The Complete Armitage Family Stories, by Joan Aiken
 Endless Things: An Ægypt Novel, by John Crowley
 The Baum Plan for Financial Independence and Other Stories, by John Kessel
 The Ant King and Other Stories, by Benjamin Rosenbaum
 The King's Last Song, by Geoff Ryman

2009
 Clouds & Ashes, by Greer Gilman
 Couch, by Benjamin Parzybok
 Interfictions II: The Second Anthology of Interstitial Writing, Edited by Delia Sherman and Christopher Barzak
 A Working Writer's Daily Planner 2010: Your Year in Writing, by Small Beer Press

Creative Commons Licensed Works
Small Beer Press maintains a collection of Creative Commons Licensed audiobooks, ebooks, and stories, in a variety of formats.

References

External links
 
 Interview with Gavin Grant and Kelly Link about Small Beer Press, conducted by Cheryl Morgan in the June, 2004 issue of Emerald City #106
 The Book People, Northampton's Small Beer Press takes a real chance on surreal books by Daniel Oppenheimer, from the Valley Advocate'', July 28, 2005

Book publishing companies based in Massachusetts
Publishing companies established in 2000
Science fiction publishers
Small press publishing companies
Literary publishing companies